Stenomelania uniformis is a species of freshwater snail, an aquatic gastropod mollusk in the family Thiaridae.

Distribution 
The species is currently known only from a small number of specimens collected in Japan. and Sulawesi, Indonesia.

References

External links 
 Quoy, J. R. C. & Gaimard, J. P. (1832-1835). Voyage de la corvette l'Astrolabe : exécuté par ordre du roi, pendant les années 1826-1827-1828-1829, sous le commandement de M. J. Dumont d'Urville. Zoologie.
 Martens, E. von. (1897). Süss- und Brackwasser-Mollusken des Indischen Archipels. Zoologische Ergebnisse Einer Reise in Niederländisch Ost-Indien 4: 1-331, pls 1-12.
 Miura, O.; Mori, H.; Nakai, S.; Satake, K.; Sasaki, T.; Chiba, S. (2008). Molecular evidence of the evolutionary origin of a Bonin Islands endemic, Stenomelania boninensis. Journal of Molluscan Studies. 74(2): 199-202

Thiaridae
Gastropods described in 1834